Sakina Khatun (born 20 June 1989 in Bangalore, Karnataka) is an Indian powerlifter who won bronze medal in the women's 61 kg event at the 2014 Commonwealth Games. Sakina Khatun was awarded (presents by Industrialist T. Anil Jain) among 9 other women achievers at the 2016 BREW awards organised by The Brew Magazine in Chennai, on the occasion of 2016 International Women's Day.

Early life 
Khatun was affiliated with polio since she was young. Her father worked as a marginal farmer and the family faced many difficulties financially. Khatun was passionate about sports from a very young. This passion pushed her to continue her journey with sports. She had to undergo 4 surgeries due to her health conditions and to survive polio. As swimming helps strengthen most muscles in body, she was suggested by doctors to take up swimming to recover from the medical procedure. It was then that her journey with sports began.  In an interview with YourStory, Khatun recollects.“Swimming definitely turned out to be an amazing experience for me. But I could not make it through either competitions or national-level championships. Then, I happened to meet Farman Basha, one [of] the most renowned powerlifters of India. He put the thought of powerlifting in my head.”

Powerlifting 
Khatun has completed her schooling from Kabiriya High School, Madrasa. She started training in powerlifting after completing her class 12th in 2010. Her training sessions would began in the morning and would last from two hours. She would again train for two hours in the evening. She says:“Considering my fragile health condition, I had to take many precautions initially. However, I went the extra mile to achieve greater heights. I did not want to be any other sportsperson. I wanted to make it to the big league. I wanted to represent my country.”She was selected for Commonwealth Games in 2014 and finished 3rd in the women's lightlifting category (up to 61 kg) after lifting a total weight of 88.2 kg. She also participated in 2020 Tokyo Paralympics where she stood 5th by lifting 93kg weight.

Awards, Medals and Recognition 

 Khatun is the only Indian woman para athlete in Indian history to win a medal at the Commonwealth Games.
 Bronze medal at Glasgow in, 2014.
 Silver Medal in Asian Pra Games, 2018.
 Sixth position at the World Championships, 2019.

References

Living people
1989 births
Indian powerlifters
Sportspeople from Bangalore
Female powerlifters
Commonwealth Games bronze medallists for India
Sportswomen from Karnataka
Powerlifters at the 2014 Commonwealth Games
Commonwealth Games medallists in weightlifting
Weightlifters from Karnataka
Paralympic powerlifters of India
Powerlifters at the 2020 Summer Paralympics
20th-century Indian women
21st-century Indian women
Powerlifters at the 2022 Commonwealth Games
Medallists at the 2014 Commonwealth Games